Lineville can refer to a place in the United States:

Lineville, Alabama
Lineville, Iowa
South Lineville, Missouri